Oulu Cathedral is an  Evangelical Lutheran cathedral and the seat of the Diocese of Oulu, located in the centre of Oulu, Finland. The church was built in 1777 as a tribute to the King of Sweden Gustav III and named after his wife as Sofia Magdalena's church.

The wooden structures burned in the large fire of the city of Oulu in 1822. The church was built again on top of the old stone walls with famous architect Carl Ludvig Engel as the designer. The restoration works were completed in 1832, but the belfry was not erected until 1845.

External links 

Evangelical Lutheran parishes in Oulu
Oulu Cathedral – Official website 

Cathedral
Carl Ludvig Engel buildings
Lutheran cathedrals in Finland
Churches completed in 1777
Pokkinen
Neoclassical church buildings in Finland